The Women's 60 kg event at the 2010 South American Games had its semifinals held on March 24 and the final on March 27.

Medalists

Results

References
Report

60kg M